Jalan Kuchai Lama is a major road in Kuala Lumpur, Malaysia. This road is maintained by the Kuala Lumpur City Hall or Dewan Bandaraya Kuala Lumpur (DBKL).

Upgrading of junctions
Construction began in August 2004 and was completed in January 2008. The new interchanges were opened to traffic on 28 February 2008.

In the 2010s, IJM Corporation built dedicated ramps, both linking between New Pantai and Sungai Besi Expressways.

List of junctions

Roads in Kuala Lumpur